One Big Holiday is a short documentary film about the band My Morning Jacket, and their relationship with their hometown of Louisville, Kentucky. Shot over a period of one week in October 2010, it chronicles the preparations of the band as they readied for a homecoming concert in the newly constructed downtown arena. Executive Producer Christopher Guetig was the band's drummer from 2000–2002.

Screenings
The film held its world theatre premiere at the LA Film+Music Weekend on March 23–25, 2012 in Los Angeles, CA.

It also was an official selection of the Chicago International Movies and Music Festival, April 12–15, 2012, in Chicago, IL.

The film had its Louisville premiere on opening night of Flyover Film Festival on June 7, 2012, with special guest Jim James of My Morning Jacket.

The film is part of My Morning Jacket's exclusive deluxe box set of Circuital, released May 31, 2011.

References

External links
 
Consequence of Sound Review, 26 May 2011

2011 films
2011 documentary films
American documentary films
Documentary films about rock music and musicians
Films shot in Kentucky
Louisville, Kentucky
My Morning Jacket
2010s English-language films
2010s American films